Gerrit Graham (born November 27, 1949) is an American stage, television, and film actor as well as a scriptwriter and songwriter. He is best known for his appearances in multiple films by Brian De Palma as well as appearances in two Star Trek series. He voiced Franklin Sherman on The Critic.

Education
Graham attended but did not graduate from Columbia University. At Columbia, he was the head of Columbia Players, the college theater company. His future co-worker, Brian De Palma, was also a former manager of the student group during his undergraduate years.

Career

Actor

Film
He has appeared in movies such as Used Cars, TerrorVision, National Lampoon's Class Reunion, Child's Play 2 and Greetings, where he worked with Brian De Palma for the first time. He would again work with De Palma on Hi, Mom and Home Movies, as well as Phantom of the Paradise, where he played flamboyant glam-rocker Beef. Sheila Benson of the Los Angeles Times remarked that Graham and Jon Lovitz were the only actors in Last Resort who were "exempt from the bad-accent stigma."

Television
Graham was the voice of Franklin Sherman in the animated series The Critic as well as a recurring role as Dr. Norman Pankow on the sitcom Parker Lewis Can't Lose.

He has appeared in two different roles on the Star Trek television series: as the alien hunter of Tosk on Star Trek: Deep Space Nine and as a member of the Q Continuum (adopting the name Quinn) in the Star Trek: Voyager episode "Death Wish".  He had been short listed to play the character of Odo, which went to René Auberjonois.

Stage
Graham is a stage performer whose performances in the 1986 improvisational show Sills & Company and the 1987 play The Bouncers by Tom Stoppard were positively reviewed by the New York Times. Julio Martinez of Variety.com called Graham "eerily evocative" of Allard Lowenstein in Dreams Die Hard in 1995. Frank Rizzo of Variety.com wrote that Graham had "some of the best lines" in his performance as Father Charles Dunbar in The God Committee in 2004. He also played Julian in Communicating Doors in 1998.

Writer
Graham wrote the teleplays for the episodes "Still Life" and "Opening Day" of the 1980s version of The Twilight Zone. He did not write "Welcome to Winfield", the only episode in which he appeared as a member of the cast.

Musician
Graham has written songs with Bob Weir of the Grateful Dead.

Filmography

Film

Television

References

External links

 
 

1948 births
Male actors from New York City
American male film actors
American male television actors
Songwriters from New York (state)
Living people
Columbia College (New York) alumni
20th-century American male actors
21st-century American male actors